Matsatseng is a community council located in the Quthing District of Lesotho. Its population in 2006 was 18,713.

Villages
The community of Matsatseng includes the villages of: 
 
 Alwynskop
 Ben Hoek
 Bolepeletsa
 Chaenese
 Dikeng
 Fola
 Folising
 Ha Caswell
 Ha George
 Ha Hlalele
 Ha Khakhau
 Ha Kose
 Ha Lekete
 Ha Lekhoba
 Ha Liqa
 Ha Lira
 Ha Mahlelehlele
 Ha Makoloane
 Ha Mathabathe
 Ha Meea
 Ha Mochaso
 Ha Moshati
 Ha Mosuoe
 Ha Mosuoe (Aupolasi)
 Ha Mosuoe (Ha Maruping)
 Ha Mosuoe (Ha Rankotoko)
 Ha Mosuoe (Mangopeng)
 Ha Taoa
 Ha Tapole
 Ha Teisi
 Ha Tlhohothelo
 Ha Zakia
 Hombani
 Katlehong
 Khatseng
 Khutsong
 Kobolong
 Kotisephola
 Letsatseng (Ha Ntami)
 Lexene (Mjanyane)
 Lihekaneng
 Linotšing
 Litorofeeng
 Maaoeng
 Mabitseng
 Mahaheng
 Majakaneng
 Makepeng
 Manganeng
 Marabeng
 Marakong
 Masakaneng
 Masitise (Motse-Mocha)
 Masitise High School
 Matebeleng
 Matsatseng
 Mdene (Mjanyane)
 Mjanyane
 Mkholu (Ntozimnande)
 Moreneng
 Mototoane
 Ndongwane
 Ngomozabantu
 Nkomandene
 Nontokwene
 Ntozimnande
 Ntozimnande (Sgwetja)
 Nxobolong
 Nxowa (Ntozimnande)
 Paballong
 Peling
 Phuleng
 Phuthing
 Seaka
 Sekoting
 Setakeng
 Setanteng
 Sizindene
 Sizindene (Mjanyane)
 Takisa
 Terateng
 Thaba-Kholo
 Thaba-Tšoeu (Mjanyane)
 Thajaneng
 Thoteng
 Tipane
 Tjotjong (Ntozimnande)
 Tlhakoaneng
 Tsekong
 Tšethe
 Tšoeneng and Waterfall

References

External links
 Google map of community villages

Populated places in Quthing District